Monardella macrantha is a species of flowering plant in the mint family known by the common name red monardella. It is native to coastal mountain ranges of southern California and Baja California, where it grows in several habitat types, including chaparral, woodlands, and forest.

Description
Monardella macrantha is a perennial herb forming a low tuft of slender stems lined with thick, shiny green leaves up to 3 centimeters long. The inflorescence is a head of several tubular flowers blooming in a cup of red-tinged green bracts up to 4 centimeters wide. The clustered flowers are bright red to yellowish in color, sometimes exceeding 4 centimeters in length with narrow lobed mouths.

Cultivation
Monardella macrantha is cultivated in by specialty plant nurseries and available as an ornamental plant for native plant, drought tolerant, natural landscape, and habitat gardens; and for ecological restoration projects.

References

External links
 Calflora Database: Monardella macrantha (Hummingbird monardella, Red monardella)
 Jepson Manual eFlora (TJM2) treatment of Monardella macrantha
 USDA Plants Profile
 UC Photos gallery: Monardella macrantha

macrantha
Flora of California
Flora of Baja California
Natural history of the California chaparral and woodlands
Natural history of the Peninsular Ranges
Natural history of the Transverse Ranges
Taxa named by Asa Gray
Garden plants of North America
Drought-tolerant plants
Groundcovers
Flora without expected TNC conservation status